Lecithin–cholesterol acyltransferase (LCAT, also called phosphatidylcholine–sterol O-acyltransferase) is an enzyme, in many animals including humans, that converts free cholesterol into cholesteryl ester (a more hydrophobic form of cholesterol), which is then sequestered into the core of a lipoprotein particle, eventually making the newly synthesized HDL spherical and forcing the reaction to become unidirectional since the particles are removed from the surface. The enzyme is bound to high-density lipoproteins (HDLs) (alpha-LCAT) and LDLs (beta-LCAT) in the blood plasma. LCAT deficiency can cause impaired vision due to cholesterol corneal opacities, anemia, and kidney damage. It belongs to the family of phospholipid:diacylglycerol acyltransferases.

Interactive pathway map

See also
 Lecithin cholesterol acyltransferase deficiency
 Acyl-CoA:cholesterol acyltransferase (ACAT)

References

Further reading

External links
 
 

Enzymes